The following highways are numbered 342:

Australia
 - Lockington Road

Canada
Manitoba Provincial Road 342
 Newfoundland and Labrador Route 342
Prince Edward Island Route 342
 Quebec Route 342
Saskatchewan Highway 342

Japan
 Japan National Route 342

United States
  Arkansas Highway 342
 Florida:
  County Road 342 (Gilchrist County, Florida)
 County Road 342 (Leon County, Florida)
  Georgia State Route 342 (former)
  Indiana State Road 342
  Louisiana Highway 342
  Maryland Route 342
  Nevada State Route 342
 New York:
  New York State Route 342
 New York State Route 342 (former)
  Ohio State Route 342
  Puerto Rico Highway 342
  Tennessee State Route 342
 Texas:
  Texas State Highway 342
  Texas State Highway Spur 342
  Virginia State Route 342
  Wyoming Highway 342